"Dreamin is a song by American rapper Young Jeezy's released as the third single from his second album The Inspiration. It features singer Keyshia Cole and is produced by The Runners.

It samples Bill Summers' song "Dreaming". This beat was sampled in the song "Another Trill N*gga Gone", a Pimp C tribute by Young B. and A-Dub.

Music video
The video directed by Chris Robinson was released on May 2, 2007 on BET's Access Granted. In the music video Keyshia Cole's hair style is similar to that of Mary J. Blige's in the video for the 1995 hit single "I'll Be There For You/You're All I Need to Get By".

Charts

References

2007 singles
Keyshia Cole songs
Jeezy songs
Songs written by Jermaine Jackson (hip hop producer)
Songs written by Andrew Harr
Song recordings produced by the Runners
2006 songs
Def Jam Recordings singles